Jan van Walré (1759, Haarlem – 1837, Haarlem), was a 19th-century bookseller, poet, and playwright from the Northern Netherlands.

Biography
He was a Remonstrant married to a Mennonite and a bookseller who became a member of Teylers Eerste Genootschap from 1781–1782. He received a large inheritance in 1782, leading him to cease his business activities and pursue his hobbies. In the same year, he joined a literature society started by Adriaan Loosjes, Vlijt moeder der Wetenschappen, and became an actor. In 1785 the society was reinvented as the theater society Leerzaam vermaak with a strong Patriotic bias with Loosjes and Walré the leaders. In 1787 Walré joined the Haarlem vrijkorps (armed citizen's guard) named Pro aris et focis as a captain and served in 1787 in Nieuwersluis. When this action failed and Haarlem returned to the orangists, Leerzaam vermaak was forbidden, but the group became active again in 1788. Loosjes began to avoid politics and in 1789 he started the Haarlem scientific society Maatschappij tot Nut van 't Algemeen. To continue his comedy pursuits, he began the society Democriet in the same year with the remark Because Heraclitus had to cry, Democritus had to laugh. In 1790, Walré joined, who again added political color, despite Loosjes' intentions to remain neutral. In 1795 when the French occupation began, the activities of Democriet reached their peak, and after that moment the society began to show similarities with freemasonry.

According to the RKD he was the grandmaster of the Haarlem satirical literary society Democriet and an amateur draughtsman.

References

Author page in the DBNL
 Books by Jan van Walré on the Google Books Library Project
Jan van Walré on Jacob Campo Weyerman website

1759 births
1837 deaths
Dutch male poets
Members of Teylers Eerste Genootschap
People from Haarlem
Remonstrants
Dutch male dramatists and playwrights
18th-century Dutch dramatists and playwrights
19th-century Dutch dramatists and playwrights